Marc Coppey (born 1969 in Strasbourg) is a French contemporary classical cellist.

Biography 
In 1988 at the age of 18, Marc Coppey won the two highest prizes of the International Johann Sebastian Bach Competition: the first prize and the special prize for best Bach performance. He was then noticed by Yehudi Menuhin.

He made his public performance debuts in Moscow and in Paris playing the Tchaikovsky Piano Trio with Menuhin and Viktoria Postnikova, on the occasion of a concert filmed by Bruno Monsaingeon. Rostropovich invited him to the Evian Festival and, from then on, his soloist career unfolded under the direction of Emmanuel Krivine, Rafael Frühbeck de Burgos, Michel Plasson, Jean-Claude Casadesus, Theodor Guschlbauer, John Nelson, Raymond Leppard, Erich Bergel, Philippe Bender, Alan Gilbert, Lionel Bringuier, Paul McCreesh, Yutaka Sado, Kirill Karabits and Asher Fisch.

External links 
 Official website
  (discography)
 Artistes · Solistes · Marc Coppey · violoncelle on Satirino
 Archet complet, le violoncelliste Marc Coppey on Télérama (10 May 2008)
 Marc Coppey on Narbonne-classic-festival.fr
 Marc Coppey on Les Musicales
 Marc Coppey on France Musique
 Marc Coppey - "Suites pour violoncelle" de/von Bach – ARTE Concert on YouTube

1969 births
Musicians from Strasbourg
Living people
Conservatoire de Paris alumni
Academic staff of the Conservatoire de Paris
French classical cellists
Chevaliers of the Ordre des Arts et des Lettres